Niels Coussement (born 2 February 1991) is a Belgian footballer who plays for Zwevezele. As a polyvalent player he is known to have played a range of different positions, from attack to defence. His main position being a wide midfielder or often used as an extra option as full back

Club career
Coussement started his career with K.V. Oostende.

References

External links
 
 

1991 births
Living people
Belgian footballers
K.V. Oostende players
K.S.V. Roeselare players
Cercle Brugge K.S.V. players
Belgian Pro League players
Challenger Pro League players
Association football fullbacks
K.S.K. Voorwaarts Zwevezele players